Robert Neil Duxbury (March 14, 1934 – June 6, 2016) was an American politician in the state of South Dakota. He was a member of the South Dakota House of Representatives and South Dakota State Senate. He was Minority Leader of the House from 1987 to 1994. A farmer and educator, Duxbury attended South Dakota State University and earned a Bachelor of Arts. He served as the South Dakota Secretary of Agriculture from 1973 to 1978. He died on June 16, 2016.

References

2016 deaths
South Dakota Democrats
1934 births
People from Hand County, South Dakota
South Dakota State University alumni